François Henricus van Kruisdijk (25 May 1952 – 5 November 2007) was a Dutch swimmer. He competed in the 200 m individual medley event at the 1972 Summer Olympics, but failed to reach the final.

References

1952 births
2007 deaths
Dutch male medley swimmers
Olympic swimmers of the Netherlands
Swimmers at the 1972 Summer Olympics
Sportspeople from Eindhoven